Gabriel Charles Bouillon (5 March 1898 – 1984) was a French classical violinist and music pedagogue.

Biography 
Gabriel Charles Bouillon was born March 5, 1898, in Montpellier, France.

Bouillon comes from a family of musicians. His brother Jo Bouillon was Josephine Baker's fourth husband. He studied in his hometown and with Jacques Thibaud in Paris. After that he taught violin at the Conservatoire de Paris. Among his pupils were Henryk Szeryng, Horst Sannemüller, Charles Chaynes, Jean-Pierre Wallez and Suna Kan.

He visited the retired composer Manuel de Falla three weeks before his death in Argentina and reported to the weekly newspaper Le Littéraire after his return to France about the unfinished oratorio Atlántida. The manuscript was later completed by the Spanish composer Ernesto Halffter.

Bouillon established his own string quartet in the 1930s. He died in Montpellier in 1984.

Bibliography 
 Ludvig Ernst Bramsen: Musikkens hvem hvad hvor. Biografier, Vol 1, Politikens håndbøger - Politikens musikbibliotek, Politikens forlag, 1961
 Angela Hughes: Pierre Fournier: Cellist in a Landscape with Figures, Ashgate, 1998

References

Weblinks 
 
 Gabriel Bouillon, Beethoven's Quartet No. 10 in E flat major  Op.74 in 1940 (YouTube)
 Quatuor Gabriel Bouillon (Discogs)

1898 births
1984 deaths
Place of birth missing
Academic staff of the Conservatoire de Paris
20th-century French male classical violinists